Pahnavar (also Romanized as Pahnāvar; also known as Pahnevar) is a village in Karipey Rural District, Lalehabad District, Babol County, Mazandaran Province, Iran. At the 2006 census, its population was 238, in 54 families.

References 

Populated places in Babol County